The  was an attempted coup d'état in the Empire of Japan, on May 15, 1932, launched by reactionary elements of the Imperial Japanese Navy, aided by cadets in the Imperial Japanese Army and civilian remnants of the ultranationalist League of Blood (Ketsumei-dan). Prime Minister Inukai Tsuyoshi was assassinated by 11 young naval officers. The following trial and popular support of the Japanese population led to extremely light sentences for the assassins, strengthening the rising power of Japanese militarism and weakening democracy and the rule of law in the Empire of Japan.

Background

As a result of the ratification of the London Naval Treaty limiting the size of the Imperial Japanese Navy, a movement grew within the junior officer corps to overthrow the government, and to replace it with military rule. This movement had parallels in the Sakurakai secret society organized within the Imperial Japanese Army. The naval officers established contacts with the ultranationalist Inoue Nissho and his "League of Blood", and agreed with his philosophy that to bring about a "Shōwa Restoration", it would be necessary to assassinate leading political and business figures.

In March 1932, in the "League of Blood Incident", Inoue's group only managed to kill former Finance Minister and head of the Rikken Minseitō, Inoue Junnosuke, and Director-General of Mitsui Holding Company, Takuma Dan.

Incident

On May 15, 1932, the naval officers, aided by army cadets, and right-wing civilian elements (including Shūmei Ōkawa, Mitsuru Tōyama, and Kōzaburō Tachibana) staged their own attempt to complete what had been started in the League of Blood Incident.

Prime Minister Inukai Tsuyoshi was shot by eleven young naval officers (most were just turning twenty years of age) in the prime minister's residence.

The original assassination plan had included killing the English film star Charlie Chaplin who had arrived in Japan on May 14, 1932, at a reception for Chaplin, planned by Prime Minister Inukai. "These activists, eager to ingest a nativist Yamato spirit into politics, recognised the charged political nature of mass culture". Chaplin's murder would facilitate war with the U.S., and anxiety in Japan, and lead on to "restoration" in the name of the emperor. When the prime minister was killed, his son Inukai Takeru was watching a sumo wrestling match with Charlie Chaplin, which probably saved both their lives.

The insurgents also attacked the residence of Makino Nobuaki, the Lord Keeper of the Privy Seal, head of the Rikken Seiyūkai political party, and tossed hand-grenades into Mitsubishi Bank headquarters in Tokyo, and several electrical transformer substations.

Aside from the murder of the prime minister, the attempted coup d'état came to nothing, and the rebellion as a whole proved a failure. The participants took a taxi to the police headquarters and surrendered themselves to the Kempeitai without a struggle.

Consequences
The eleven officers who murdered Prime Minister Inukai were court-martialed. During the proceedings, the accused used the trial as a platform to proclaim their loyalty to the emperor and to arouse popular sympathy by appealing for reforms of the government and economy. By end of the trial, the court had received 110,000 clemency petitions, either signed or written entirely in blood, from sympathizers around the country pleading for a lenient sentence. Additionally, nine youths in Niigata asked to be tried by the court instead of the accused, and sent the court a jar containing nine of their own pickled severed pinky fingers as a gesture of their sincerity.

The punishment handed down by the court was extremely light, and there was little doubt in the Japanese press that the murderers of Prime Minister Inukai would be released in a couple of years, if not sooner. Failure to severely punish the plotters in the May 15 Incident further eroded the rule of law and the power of the democratic government in Japan to confront the military. Indirectly, it led to the February 26 Incident and the increasing rise of Japanese militarism.

References

Bibliography

External links

 National Diet Library Reference

Conflicts in 1932
1932 in Japan
Politics of the Empire of Japan
Assassinations in Japan
Attempted coups in Japan
Rebellions in Japan
Shōwa Restoration
May 1932 events
1930s coups d'état and coup attempts
Terrorist incidents in the 1930s
Events that led to courts-martial
1932 murders in Japan